A list of films produced in Brazil in 1939:

See also
 1939 in Brazil

External links
Brazilian films of 1939 at the Internet Movie Database

Lists of 1939 films by country or language
1939
Films